Myseum is a children's museum and indoor playground located at 283 Lamp and Lantern Village, in Town and Country, Missouri. It was established by Jana and Jeffrey Deutch and opened in 2012.

References

External links

Museums in St. Louis County, Missouri
Children's museums in Missouri
Organizations established in 2012